The All India Services (AIS) comprises the Indian Administrative Service, Indian Police Service and Indian Forest Service. A unique feature of the All India Services is that the members of these services are recruited by the centre (Union government in federal polity), but their services are placed under various State cadres, and they have the ability to serve both under the State and under the centre. Due to the federal polity of the country, this is considered one of the tools that makes union government stronger than state governments. Officers of these three services comply to the All India Services Rules relating to pay, conduct, leave, various allowances etc.

The All India Services Act, 1951, provides for the creation of two more All India Services, namely, the Indian Engineering Service and the Indian Medical Service.

The Ministry of Personnel, Public Grievances and Pensions is the cadre controlling authority for the Indian Administrative Service, The Ministry of Home Affairs is the cadre controlling authority for the Indian Police Service and the Ministry of Environment, Forest and Climate Change for the Forest Service. The examination for recruitment of IAS and IPS is conducted by the Union Public Service Commission (UPSC) on the basis of the annual Civil Services Examination, a common civil service examination, and for the Indian Forest Service on the basis of the Forest Service Examination. Since 2012 onwards, the preliminary (first test) of the two examinations are combined. These officers are recruited and trained by the Central Government, and then allotted to different State cadres.

History
The history of All India Services dates back to the British era when initially Civil Servants were appointed by the Court of Directors of the British East India Company. The service in those times was known as 'Covenanted Civil Service'. With time, they came to be known as Indian Civil Service (ICS).

In 1947, with India gaining independence, ICS was replaced by Indian Administrative Service (IAS) and the Indian Police (IP) was replaced by Indian Police Service (IPS) and were recognised by the Indian Constitution as All-India Services. 
In 1963, Indian Forest Service (IFS) was created and it came into existence in 1966.

Power, purpose and responsibilities
The All India Services Act, 1951 empowers the government of India to make, after consultation with state governments, rules for the regulation of recruitment and conditions of service of the persons appointed to an All India Service. All India Service is governed by All India Service (Conduct) Rules, 1968 which specifies the code of conduct for Civil Servant in general. The All India Service (Conduct) Rules, 1968 were amended latest by Govt. of India by notification published in official Gazette of India on 10 April 2015.

Nature of work
Responsibilities vary with the seniority of the civil servant. Junior officers begin with probation and move up in the hierarchy. At the district level the responsibilities are concerned with district matters as well as all developmental affairs while at the divisional level the responsibilities focus on law and order also. Policy framing is carried on at the State and Central levels.

Allocation, division and cadres

Cadre allocation policy 
The central government announced a new cadre allocation policy for the All India Services in August 2017, touting it as a policy to ensure national integration of the bureaucracy and to ensure an All India character of the services. The existing twenty-sixcadres were to be divided into fivezones by the Department of Personnel and Training. Under the new policy, a candidate first selects their zones of preference, in descending order, then indicates a cadre preference from each preferred zone. The candidate indicates their second cadre preference for every preferred zone subsequently. The preference for the zones and cadres remains in the same order and no change is permitted.

Officers remain in their allocated cadre or are deputed to the Government of India.

Indian Administrative Service

IAS Officers are trained to handle Government affairs. This being the main responsibility, every civil servant is assigned to a particular office which deals with policy matters pertaining to that area. The policy matters are framed, modified, interpreted in this office under the direct supervision of the Administrative Officer in consultation with the Minister. The implementation of policies is also done on the advice of the Officer. The Cabinet Secretary stands at the top of the government machinery involved in policy making followed by Secretary/Additional Secretary, Joint Secretary, Director, Under Secretary and Junior Scale Officers in that order. These appointments are filled by civil servants according to seniority in the Civil Services. In the process of decision making, a number of officers give their views to the Minister who weighs the matter and makes a decision considering the issue involved.

The implementation process involves supervision and touring. The allocation of enormous funds to and by the field officers calls for supervision and the officials concerned have to reply to queries made in the Parliament for which they must remain well informed.

The Civil servant has also to represent the Government in another country or in International forums. At the level of Deputy Secretary, they are even authorized to sign agreements on behalf of the Government.

A civil servant begins their career in the state with two years in probation. This period is spent at training schools, Secretariat, field offices or in a District Magistrate's office. They are given the position of Sub-Divisional Magistrate and have to look after the law, order and general administration including developmental work in the area under their charge. After the probation and 2 years of services as a junior scale officer, the officer is put in the senior scale. Then they may function as District Magistrate, Managing Director of a Public Enterprise or Director of a Department. Senior Scale comprises the Senior Time Scale (Joint Secretary), Junior Administrative Grade (Additional Secretary) and the Selection Grade (Special Secretary). Selection Grade is given on promotion after 13 years of regular service. The next promotion within the State is that of a Commissioner-cum-Secretary after 16 years. This promotion also entitles them to the Super Time Scale. Then after 24 years of regular service an IAS officer may be promoted to Above super time scale who is designated as Principal Secretaries/Financial Commissioners in some states

Each State has many Secretaries/Principal Secretaries and only one Chief Secretary. Some appointments of Secretaries are considered more prestigious than others, e.g., the Finance Secretary, Development Commissioners, Home Secretary and hence they enjoy the salary of a Principal Secretary. the Chief Secretary in the State is the top ranking civil servant and may be assisted by Additional Chief Secretaries. In some cadres/States e.g. New Delhi, Financial Commissioner and other high ranking secretaries such as Additional Chief Secretaries enjoy the pay of the Chief Secretary .

In the District, the administrative head is the Collector or Deputy Commissioner or District Magistrate. The DM/Collector/DC handle the affairs of the District including development functions. They necessarily tour all rural sectors inspecting specific projects, disputed sites and look into the problems of people on the spot also.

At the divisional level, the Divisional Commissioner is in charge of their division. Their role is to oversee law and order and general administration and developmental work. Appeals against the Divisional Commissioner are heard by the Chairman of the Board of Revenue.

Indian Forest Service

India was one of the first countries in the world to introduce scientific forest management. In 1864, the British Raj established the Imperial Forest Department. In 1866 Dr. Dietrich Brandis, a German forest officer, was appointed Inspector General of Forests. The Imperial Forest Service (IFS) was organized in 1867. 
 
IFS Officers appointed from 1867 to 1885 were trained in Germany and France, and from 1885 to 1905 at Cooper's Hill, London, which was a noted professional college of forestry. From 1905 to 1926, the University of Oxford, University of Cambridge, and University of Edinburgh undertook the task of training Imperial Forestry Service officers.
 
From 1927 to 1932, forest officers were trained at the Imperial Forest Research Institute (FRI) at Dehradun (established in 1906). Later The Indian Forest College (IFC) was established in 1938 at Dehradun, and officers recruited to the Superior Forest Service by the states and provinces were trained there. Forestry, which was managed by the federal government until then, was transferred to the "provincial list" by the Government of India Act 1935, and recruitment to the Imperial Forestry Service was subsequently discontinued.
 
The modern Indian Forest Service was established in 1966, after independence, under the All India Services Act 1951, for protection, conservation, and regeneration of forest resources.
 
India has an area of 635,400 km designated as forests, about 19.32 percent of the country. Forest is included in the Concurrent List.

Ranks of the Indian Forest Service are as follows: Assistant Conservator of Forests - Probationary Officer, Divisional Forest Officer (DFOs), 
Deputy Conservator of Forests,
Conservator of Forests (CFs),
Chief Conservator of Forests (CCFs),
Additional Principal Chief Conservator of Forests (Addl.PCCFs),
Principal Chief Conservator of Forests (PCCF) & Principal Chief Conservator of Forests (HoFF) - highest post in a State,
Director General of Forests (India) - highest post at Centre, selected from amongst the senior-most PCCFs of states.

The training at Indira Gandhi National Forest Academy is designed in such a way that a Forest Service officer after completion of the probation, should be hardened enough to serve in the most difficult terrains of India. Another remarkable feature of this service is that it needs keen technical knowledge along with excellent administrative capacity to deliver the duty. Government of India is also providing Hari Singh fellowships to Forest Service officers to get specialized in the field of Remote Sensing and Geographical Information System from the ISRO's Indian Institute of Remote Sensing, University of Twente/ITC Netherlands and in Wildlife Management from the Wildlife Institute of India. The Forest Service officers also work in various International and National organizations related to management of forests, wildlife and environment such as Food and Agricultural Organization of the United Nations, International Centre for Integrated Mountain Development, SAARC Forestry Centre, Forest Survey of India, Wildlife Institute of India, Indian Council of Forestry Research and Education (ICFRE), Indira Gandhi National Forest Academy (IGNFA), Directorate of Forest Education, Wildlife Crime Control Bureau (WCCB), etc. besides getting entrusted with senior positions in the Central Secretariat, State Secretariats and various assignments under the Central Staffing Scheme.

Indian Police Service

The Indian Police Service more popularly known as the 'IPS', is responsible for internal security, public safety and law and order. In 1948, a year after India gained independence from Britain, the Imperial Police (IP) was replaced by the Indian Police Service. The IPS is not a law enforcement agency in its own right; rather it is the body to which all senior police officers belong regardless of the agency for whom they work.

An IPS officer is subjected to and faces several life-threatening, crucial, complicated and harsh conditions. They are entrusted with the overall internal security of the entire State as the Director General of Police and entire Districts as its Superintendent of Police, and in Metropolitan Cities as Deputy Commissioner or the entire City as the Commissioner of Police. As Commissioner of Police they enjoy magisterial powers.

The IPS officer takes charge as an Assistant Superintendent of Police of a Sub-division/circle after probation of 2 years. The tenure of this post is normally 3 years. The next appointment is as Superintendent of Police or Deputy Commissioner of Police after 4 years, they get promoted to Junior Administrative Grade after 9 years, then they serve as Senior Superintendent of Police and get pay of Selection Grade (Level 13) in 12–14 years, then as Deputy Inspector General of Police or Additional Commissioner of Police in 15 years, an Inspector General of Police in 18 years, Additional Director General of Police in 25 years and finally, the Director General of Police after 30 years in service.

IPS officers also work in national government agencies such as Intelligence Bureau, Research and Analysis Wing, Central Bureau of Investigation, etc. IPS officers also get highly placed in several PSUs such as GAIL, SAIL, Indian Oil Corporation Limited etc. at the State Secretariat the Central Secretariat under the Central Staffing Scheme and in CAPFs at leadership positions of National Security Guards, Border Security Force, the Indo-Tibetan Border Police, the Central Reserve Police Force and the Central Industrial Security Force, etc. An IPS officer has vast opportunities to work in several International Organisations such as Interpol, International Cricket Council, the United Nations, Consulates (Foreign Missions) and Embassies all over the World in various capacities such as First Secretary, Consul, Consul General, Deputy High Commissioner, Minister, High Commissioner and Ambassador.

The Director General of Police and Commissioner of Police is the head of the entire police force of the State or Metropolitan City (e.g. Kolkata, Delhi, Mumbai, Chennai, Madhya Pradesh etc.) and below him is the Additional DGP/Special Police Commissioner. The Inspector General or Joint Commissioner of Police is at the head of certain specialised police force like Criminal Investigation Department, Special Branch, etc.

Reforms and changes
In January 2012, the Government amended All India Services Rule 16 (3) which permits the Central Government in consultation with the State Government to retire in the public interest, incompetent and non-performing Officers after a review on their completion of 15 years or 25 years of qualifying service or attaining the age of 50.

On recommendation by Ministry of Personnel, Public Grievances and Pensions, from year 2014 state civil servants are required to clear 1000 marks four-stage process including a written exam and interview conducted by Union Public Service Commission to get promoted to the three all India services which was previously based solely on basis of seniority and annual confidential reports.

Expected Reforms 
Creating the remaining two All India Services, as provided by the All India Services Act, 1951:
 Indian Engineering Service
 Indian Medical Service

See also
 Civil Services of India
Special Duty Allowance (SDA)
Indian Forest Service

References

External links
 All India Services official website
 Union Public Service Commission official website
 Indian Administrative Service official website
 Indian Police Service official website
 Indian Forest Service official website
List of IAS officers